Sweden entered the Eurovision Song Contest 1990, held in Zagreb, Yugoslavia.

Swedish broadcaster Sveriges Television used their tried-and-tested pre-selection Melodifestivalen to select their entry for the 29th time. Melodifestivalen 1990 was held on 9 March, where ten artists competed.

Edin-Ådahl won the contest, beating 1983 representative Carola Häggkvist to second place. Their song, written by Mikael Wendt, was "Som en vind".

Before Eurovision

Melodifestivalen 1990
Melodifestivalen 1990 was the contest for selection of the 30th song to represent Sweden at the Eurovision Song Contest. It was the 29th time that this method of picking a song had been used. 1,223 songs were submitted to SVT for the competition. The final was held in the Rondo in Gothenburg on 9 March 1990, presented by Carin Hjulström and was broadcast on TV2 but not on radio. The show was watched by 5,964,000 people, the biggest recorded audience for the competition (74.1% of Sweden's 1990 population).

Voting

At Eurovision 
At the contest Sweden performed 18th, following Ireland and preceding Italy. At the close of the voting they had received 24 points, being placed 16th of 22 countries competing.

Voting

References

External links
Swedish National Final 1990
TV broadcastings at SVT's open archive

1990
Countries in the Eurovision Song Contest 1990
1990
Eurovision
Eurovision